Jordan's Special Royal Guard Command is a part of the Jordanian Armed Forces, and is composed of two infantry combat brigades, one ceremonial bodyguard, one training center, and a Horse mounted unit. The combat Brigade‘s are divided into armored infantry and fire support battalions as well as a special Air defense battalion. The Royal Guard Brigade is one of the most elite units of the Jordanian army and is primarily responsible for the military protection and defense of the royal Hashemite dynasty.

Organizational structure

Hamza Ibn Abd Al-Muttalib (Sayed Al-Shuhada) Royal Guard Brigade 
The Royal Guard Brigade is based in Amman. Its members are largely recruited from the most loyal Bedouin tribes of the east bank of Jordan. It is not to be confused with the king's Circassian Bodyguard who, though part of the Special Royal Guard Command, are a separate unit primarily assigned to ceremonial duties within the interior of Jordan's various Royal palaces.

Brigade Structure:
 Brigade HQ
 His Majesty Special Security Group  (مجموعة الأمن الخاص لجلالة القائد الأعلى)
 Muhammadiyah District Group  (مجموعة منطقة المحمدية)
 Al-Maqqar Ala'amir District Group  (مجموعة منطقة المقر العامر)
 Fire Support Group  (مجموعة الإسناد الناري)
 Honor Guard Group  (مجموعة حرس الشرف)
 Special Royal Guard Engineering Unit (وحدة هندسة الحرس الملكي الخاص)
Royal Guard Knights (Horse Mounted) Unit  (وحدة الفرسان)
 Royal Guard Training Center

His Majesty’s Special Security Group 
The Special Royal Guard Command is under the direct personal control of the King. His Majesty’s Special Security Group is a unit within the Royal Guard Brigade that is responsible for the close personal security of the king and is basically the Jordanian equivalent of the U.S. Secret Service. His Majesty Special Security Group accompanies the king 24 hours seven days a week and maintains security at his offices and various Palaces. It was formerly commanded by the king's brother, Prince Ali.

Hussein Bin Ali 30th Special Mission Brigade 
The Special Mission Brigade has a dual function.  While it provides security services to the royal palace it is also charged with the protection of other important Jordanian state institutions and the maintenance of internal security within the state. This includes anti-terrorist security operations in urban areas.

Brigade Structure:

Brigade HQ
 Signal Company
 15th Special Mission Battalion
 16th Special Mission Battalion
 20th Special Mission Battalion
 14th Special AD Battalion

Circassian Bodyguard 
The Circassian bodyguard currently consists of 14 men selected from among the Circassian tribes of Jordan who currently number about 100,000 people. New recruits must complete eight months of training in self-defense, security, Palace protocol and military techniques before joining the bodyguard. The guards wear two ceremonial swords: a long blade bearing an engraving reading “If God helps you, no one can overcome you,” and another blade nicknamed “the scent of death.

Commanders

 Brigadier Hussein Majali (?)
 Lieutenant-Colonel Prince Ali bin Hussein (1999 - January 28, 2008)

References

External links

Military of Jordan
Special Security
Royal guards
Jordanian monarchy
Guards of honour
Military units and formations established in 1920
Military units and formations established in 1956